Doncaster (York Road) railway station was built as a terminus for services on the Hull and Barnsley and Great Central Joint Railway in Doncaster, South Yorkshire, England. It was reached by a triangular junction from the main line just outside town. The station was set at the north end of town, just beyond the Doncaster Avoiding Line, in the fork of the old A1 and the A19 (York Road).

The line and its stations were ready for opening on 1 May 1916 but its five-passenger stations, at Snaith & Pollington, Sykehouse, Thorpe-in-Balne, Doncaster (York Road) and Warmsworth never saw a passenger train. The route duplicated that of other railways in the area and the stations were some way from the villages they purported to serve.

The station was kept fully intact until the late 1960s when demolition finally came.

The only passenger trains to work over the line were enthusiasts specials, the last of these was the "Doncaster Decoy", which ran on 5 October 1968.

References 
"Great Central", Vol.3 (Fay Sets The Pace, 1900–1922), Ian Allan / Locomotive Pub.Co.,1965. 
"The Railways of the South Yorkshire Coalfield from 1880", Arthur L.Barnett, RCTS 1984.   
"Railways in South Yorkshire", C.T.Goode, Dalesman Publications 1975. 

Disused railway stations in Doncaster
Railway stations in Great Britain opened in 1916